The Fire HDX, formerly named Kindle Fire HDX, was a high-end model in Amazon Fire line of tablet computers. It was announced on September 25, 2013 and was available in two models, 7 inch and 8.9 inch. The 7 inch WiFi model was released on October 18, 2013 and the 8.9 inch WiFi model was released on November 7, 2013 in the United States.

In September 2014, Amazon released the second generation of the Fire HDX 8.9 model that has a faster processor and a more powerful graphics processing unit. In addition, the name "Kindle" was removed from all of the Fire tablets' names.

The Fire HDX tablets were discontinued, and the Fire HD tablet line now includes the most powerful versions of Amazon Fire devices.

Design

Hardware 
Both the 7 inch and 8.9 inch LCD models contain a Qualcomm Snapdragon 800 processor that has an Adreno 330 GPU.  The models also have a 1.2 megapixel front camera that shoots 720p HD video.  The 8.9 inch model has an 8 megapixel rear camera that shoots HD 1080p video. The exterior surface has angular, raised plastic edges with the power and volume buttons located on the backside. The Fire HDX features Dolby Digital Plus audio engine powering the two attached speakers. A normal user will get about 12 hours of battery life from a full charge.

The Fire HDX 8.9" refresh in 2014 uses a Qualcomm Snapdragon 805 processor with an Adreno 420 GPU. The sound system features Dolby Atmos speaker technology and the Wi-Fi version weighs 13.2 ounces (375 grams).

Software 
Both models use Fire OS 3 which is a proprietary fork of Android 4.2.2. It features "Mayday", a button for free tech support available any time, "Silk", a cloud-accelerated browser, the Amazon Appstore for games and apps and Amazon.com services for media content purchases. The tablets can send video content to a supported TV, game console or through a device like a Wireless Display HDMI adapter wirelessly using "Second Screen", but cannot send content via a HDMI cable like its predecessor, the Kindle Fire HD.

The 2014 refresh uses Fire OS 4 "Sangria", which features profiles so each user on the tablet can have their own settings and apps.

Mayday feature 
Sascha Segan of PC Magazine mentioned: "Press the Mayday button, and within 15 seconds, a live Amazon operator appears in a video chat window on your screen to answer all of your Kindle Fire questions. He or she will even tell you what apps to download. I've never seen anything else like it on a tablet." In his review of the Kindle Fire HDX 7" he called the Mayday remote video support feature as "revolutionary" and "Amazon's most exciting feature".

In June 2018, however, Amazon "quietly" discontinued the Mayday feature.

Fire OS UI 
The Fire HDX's UI has a "Carousel" which contains the most recent apps used and ones that have been updated or purchased recently.  The Carousel also holds documents, videos, music, and books. The  Fire HDX also has a favorites tab in which the user can access the users apps from any other application.

Models 
Overview on generations and models for all Fire tablet devices:

Detailed specifications for all Fire HDX tagged tablet devices:

The Model number consists of three parts: first the KF prefix for 'Kindle Fire', second one or two letters derived from the code name, third WI for Wi-Fi or WA for cellular interface.

Reception 
Engadget gave the Fire HDX an 85 out of 100, saying that it may be the most compelling case for Amazon's tablet ecosystem. While advanced users may be turned off by the limited app selection, the display's gorgeous color accuracy may make the tablet a good buy for everyone else, especially Amazon Prime members.

PC Magazine gave the Amazon Kindle Fire HDX 7" (Wi-Fi) edition 4 out of 5 and rated "Excellent" while following pros were noted: "Sharp screen. Fast processor. Extremely easy to use. Amazing live tech support."

The Fire HDX's screen has high color accuracy and high pixel density at 339 PPI, and as of early 2013 was one of the highest of tablet devices commercially available.  However, CNET pointed out that no Google Play access means limited app selection compared to other Android tablets and some users may be bothered by an additional $15 to remove ads on the lock screen, while ads on the home screen can be removed with a system setting.

See also 
 Tablet computers
 E-book readers

References

External links 
 Official Amazon.com site for 7" version
 Official Amazon.com site for 8.9" version

Fire HDX
Android (operating system) devices
Tablet computers
Tablet computers introduced in 2013
Touchscreen portable media players